Chirkovskaya is a rural locality (a village) in Korobitsynskoye Rural Settlement, Syamzhensky District, Vologda Oblast, Russia. The population was 25 as of 2002.

Geography 
Chirkovskaya is located 34 km east of Syamzha (the district's administrative centre) by road. Shishakovo is the nearest rural locality.

References 

Rural localities in Syamzhensky District